The Yamaha YD 100 is a light motorcycle manufactured by the Dawood Yamaha Ltd. of Pakistan. Introduced in 2003, It comes as a naked frame, and has a single-cylinder, air-cooled, four-stroke engine, which displaces . It is a very popular learner motorbike in Pakistan.

YD100